James Brian Weaver (born February 19, 1939), nicknamed "Fluff", is a former Major League Baseball pitcher.

Sources

Major League Baseball pitchers
California Angels players
Cocoa Indians players
Burlington Indians players (1958–1964)
Reading Indians players
Mobile Bears players
Salt Lake City Bees players
Portland Beavers players
Oklahoma City 89ers players
Seattle Angels players
El Paso Sun Kings players
Hawaii Islanders players
Elmira Pioneers players
Baseball players from Pennsylvania
1939 births
Living people
Sportspeople from Lancaster, Pennsylvania
American expatriate baseball players in Nicaragua